Robert "Bobby" Young was the lead on the team that represented Scotland at the 1959 and 1962 Scotch Cups, the world men's curling championship at the time. He and the team of skip Willie Young, third John Pearson, and second Sandy Anderson curled out of the Airth, Bruce Castle, and Dunmore Curling Club in Falkirk, Scotland.

In addition to his 2 Scotch Cup appearances, he also won four "Worlds Curling Championships" (now known as the Edinburgh International).

References

External links
 
 

 Video:
 
 

Sportspeople from Falkirk
Scottish male curlers
Scottish curling champions
Year of birth missing (living people)
Living people